George Jeger (19 March 1903 – 6 January 1971) was a British Labour Party politician. He served as the Member of Parliament for Winchester from 1945 to 1950 (which after his term became a safe seat for the Conservatives until they lost it to the Liberal Democrats in 1997), and achieving candidature for a more promising majority seat was immediately after elected as the MP for Goole from 1950, which he held until his death in 1971. He previously worked as a bank official and a freelance journalist, and served as a member of Shoreditch Borough Council from 1926 to 1940, and as Mayor of Shoreditch from 1937 to 1938.

He was the brother of Santo Jeger, brother-in-law of Lena Jeger, and father of Jenny Jeger.

References

Footnotes

External links 
 

1903 births
1971 deaths
Labour Party (UK) MPs for English constituencies
UK MPs 1945–1950
UK MPs 1950–1951
UK MPs 1951–1955
UK MPs 1955–1959
UK MPs 1959–1964
UK MPs 1964–1966
UK MPs 1966–1970
UK MPs 1970–1974
Jewish British politicians